Gary Wayne Zimmerman (born December 13, 1961) is an American former professional football player who played as an offensive tackle in the National Football League (NFL). Zimmerman played for the Minnesota Vikings from 1986 to 1992 and for the Denver Broncos from 1993 to 1997. He won Super Bowl XXXII with the Broncos against the Green Bay Packers. He was selected to the Pro Bowl seven times and was an All-Pro selection eight times. He attended Walnut High School and the University of Oregon whereby he was inducted into the Oregon Sports Hall of Fame in 2002 and the Pro Football Hall of Fame in 2008.

Professional career

Los Angeles Express
In 1984, Zimmerman was drafted in the second round (36th overall) by the Los Angeles Express in the 1984 USFL Draft. He subsequently signed with the Express on February 13, 1984 and went on to play in 17 games that season, starting all 17 at left tackle. His Express teammate was future Pro Football Hall of Famer, QB Steve Young. The Express lost in the USFL Semi-Finals to the Arizona Wranglers to end a 10-8 regular season. In 1985, Zimmerman suited up again with the Express, playing in 18 games (starting 17) with a 3-15 club that ended up out of the USFL playoff picture.

Minnesota Vikings
After the USFL folded in August 1986, Zimmerman joined the Minnesota Vikings after they obtained his rights from the New York Giants who drafted him in the 1984 NFL Supplemental Draft of USFL and CFL Players.

During his time in the NFL, Zimmerman was famous for his refusal to interact with the media. This disdain for the sports press came about due to an early incident in his NFL career, after comments made by Zimmerman condemning the Vikings offensive players for a loss were made public by the media. Zimmerman claimed that his teammates ostracized him for speaking ill of his teammates' performance; this led Zimmerman to decide to boycott the sports media as a result, refusing to do interviews or engage in any sort of interaction with them for the rest of his career.

Denver Broncos
Zimmerman ultimately left the Vikings for the Broncos in 1993, and stayed with the team from 1993 to 1997. He would be part of the team's first Super Bowl-winning squad, winning the game in 1997 and was "in spirit" for the 1998 season. Arriving as the veteran player in 1993 to an offense that was made up of mostly rookies, Zimmerman became the de facto leader of the Broncos offensive line on and off the field. Zimmerman started the Denver offensive line tradition of not speaking to the media. It became a long running tradition that would continue on a full decade after his retirement in 1997. In 2007 the NFL created “The Broncos O-line rule" in response, requiring all players to talk to the media.

He played in 184 NFL games, starting 169 of them.

On February 2, 2008, he was elected to the Pro Football Hall of Fame.

Zimmerman joins Reggie White, Steve Young, Jim Kelly, Marv Levy, George Allen, Bill Polian, and Sid Gillman as former USFL/AFL league members who are enshrined in the Pro Football Hall of Fame.

References

External links
 

1961 births
Living people
American Conference Pro Bowl players
American football offensive tackles
Denver Broncos players
Los Angeles Express players
Minnesota Vikings players
National Conference Pro Bowl players
Oregon Ducks football players
People from Walnut, California
Players of American football from California
Pro Football Hall of Fame inductees
Sportspeople from Fullerton, California
Sportspeople from Los Angeles County, California
Ed Block Courage Award recipients